Vanilla is a 2018 Indian Kannada-language mystery film directed by Jayatheertha and starring newcomers Avinash J and Swathi Konde with Ravishankar Gowda.

Cast 
Avinash J as Avinash a.k.a. Avi
Swathi Konde as Anagha a.k.a. Anu
Ravishankar Gowda as Police inspector
Paavana Gowda
Rehman
Girish

Reception 
A critic from Deccan Herald gave the film a rating of four out of five stars and wrote that "Vanilla has gripping sequences, fine and believable twists". A critic from The Times of India wrote that "If you are in the mood to play Sherlock, make a trip to the theatre to solve the Vanilla mystery". A critic from The Hindu wrote that "The director deserves appreciation for experimenting with a new theme with a new approach".

References 

2010s Kannada-language films
Indian mystery films